In Croatian law, murder is classified into 3 categories: ubojstvo, teško ubojstvo and usmrćenje according to the 10th section of the Criminal Law of 2011.

Teško ubojstvo: Murder with Special Circumstances
Any murder of a police officer, child under the age of 14, murder of multiple people, or murder committed along with any violent felony classifies as murder with special circumstances. It is punishable with no less than 10 years imprisonment, or a long-term sentence (up to 40 years of imprisonment under Croatian law).

Ubojstvo: Murder
This is classified any intentional killing of another human being with no special circumstances. Punishable with no less than 5 years of imprisonment.

Usmrćenje and Prouzročenje smrti iz nehaja: Manslaughter
There are three forms of usmrćenje, or reckless murder:
 A murder that has been provoked - punishable no less than 1 year and not more than 10 years of prison.
 Mother murdering their child after birth - six months to five years.
 Sympathy killing - up to three years.

There's also prouzročenje smrti iz nehaja, meaning involuntary manslaughter, which carries a penalty of six months to five years imprisonment.

Suicide and abortion

The criminal law also defines separate penalties for:
 assisting in a suicide
 assisting in an illegal abortion
 assisting in euthanasia

References

Sources
 

Croatia
Murder in Croatia
Law of Croatia